The 2022–23 season is Motherwell's thirty-eighth consecutive season in the top flight of Scottish football, having been promoted from the Scottish First Division at the end of the 1984–85 season.

Season review

Preseason
On 30 May, Motherwell confirmed a week-long training camp in Obertraun, Austria, between the 3rd to 10th July in the lead up to their 2022–23 UEFA Europa Conference League Second qualifying round matches.

Transfers
On 27 May 2022, Motherwell announced the signing of Blair Spittal to a two-year contract, from Ross County on a free transfer once his previous contract expired on 31 May 2022.

On 22 June 2022, Motherwell announced the signing of Paul McGinn to a one-year contract from Hibernian on a free transfer.

On 24 June, Motherwell announced that academy graduates, Josh Bogan, Robbie Garcia, Arran Bone, Brannan McDermott, Max Ross, Dylan Wells, Luca Ross, Shay Nevans and Mark Ferrie had all signed professional deals with the club.

On 11 July, Motherwell announced the signing of Josh Morris, on a free transfer from Salford City, to a two-year contract.

On 14 July, Motherwell announced that Kaiyne Woolery had left the club to join TFF First League club Sakaryaspor for an undisclosed fee.

On 26 July, Kevin van Veen signed a one-year extension to his contract, keeping him at Motherwell until the summer of 2024.

July
On 29 July, manager Graham Alexander and his assistant Chris Lucketti left the club by mutual consent, with Steven Hammell being placed in temporary charge.

August
On 11 August, Steven Hammell was confirmed as Motherwells new permanent Manager.

On 13 August, Motherwell announced the signing of Aston Oxborough to a two-year contract, after he'd left Norwich City at the end of the previous season.

On 17 August, Motherwell announced the return of Stuart McKinstry to the club, on a season-long loan deal from Leeds United.

On 25 August, Motherwell announced the signing of Matt Penney on loan from Ipswich Town for six-months.

On 30 August, Motherwell announced that return of Rolando Aarons on a season-long loan deal from Huddersfield Town.

September
On 1 September, Motherwell announced that Juhani Ojala had left the club by mutual consent, whilst David Devine, Logan Dunachie and Scott Fox all left the club on loan for the season, joining Alloa Athletic, East Kilbride and Queen of the South respectively.

On 2 September, Motherwell announced the season-long loan signing of Louis Moult from Burton Albion.

On 6 September, Max Johnston joined Cove Rangers on loan for the season.

On 9 September, Motherwell's away trip to Ross County, scheduled for 10 September, was postponed after the SPFL postponed all football fixtures from 9 – 11 September as a mark of respect following the death of Elizabeth II the previous day. On 16 September, it was confirmed that Motherwell's postponed fixture against Ross County would now be played at 19:45 on 4 October.

On 30 September, Ewan Wilson joined Albion Rovers on loan for the remainder of the season, whilst Robbie Mahon joined Dunfermline Athletic and Corey O’Donnell joined Bonnyrigg Rose Athletic on similar deals.

October
On 5 October, Daniel Hunter joined Cumbernauld Colts on loan for the remainder of the season.

November
On 2 November, Motherwell announced that Rolando Aarons' had been ended early due to the injury suffered against Heart of Midlothian.

On 24 November, Scott Fox returned from his loan spell at Queen of the South after it was ended by mutual agreement.

December
On 16 December, Motherwell's home against St Mirren, scheduled for 17 December, was postponed due to extensive stadium damage and flooding caused by recent cold weather.

On 19 December, Motherwell announced the signing of Shane Blaney from Sligo Rovers to a two-and-a-half year contract, starting 1 January 2023.

On 22 December, Scott Fox left Motherwell by mutual agreement.

On 29 December, Motherwell's postponed Round 17 match against St Mirren was rearranged for 15 February.

January
On 1 January, Max Johnston was recalled from his loan spell with Cove Rangers.

On 5 January, Daniel Hunter's loan to Cumbernauld Colts was extended until the end of the season. The following day, 6 January, Louis Moult's loan deal was ended through injury and he returned to Burton Albion.

On 12 January, Motherwell announced the signing of Ollie Crankshaw on loan from Stockport County for the remainder of the season. The following day, 13 January, Motherwell announced the signing of Mikael Mandron on a contract until the end of the season.

On 18 January, Matt Penney returned to parent club Ipswich Town.

On 20 January, goalkeeper Matthew Connelly joined Stranraer on loan for the rest of the season.

On 21 January, Kian Speirs joined Stenhousemuir on loan for the rest of the season.

On 26 January, Barry Maguire joined Dundee on loan for the rest of the season.

On 28 January, Motherwell announced the signing of Riku Danzaki from Hokkaido Consadole Sapporo on a contract until the summer of 2025.

On 31 January, Sondre Johansen left the club to sign for Odd for an undisclosed fee, and Connor Shields joined Queen of the South on loan for the remainder of the season. Later on in the day Motherwell announced the loan signing of James Furlong from Brighton & Hove Albion for the remainder of the season, and the permanent signing of Jack Aitchison from Barnsley until the end of the season.

February
On 1 February, Motherwell announced the signing of Jonathan Obika on loan from Morecambe for the remainder of the season.

On 3 February, Motherwell announced the signing of Dan Casey who'd most recently played for Sacramento Republic. The following day, 4 February, Motherwell announced the signing of Calum Butcher on a contract until the summer of 2024 following his release from Burton Albion.

On 11 February, Steven Hammell left his role as Head Coach of Motherwell, with Stuart Kettlewell being placed in temporary charge. After two wins from two, Kettlewell was named as Motherwells new permanent Manager on 22 February.

On 28 February, Logan Dunachie joined Forfar Athletic on loan for the remainder of the season.

Squad

Transfers

In

 Transfers were announced on the above date, but didn't come into effect until 1 June 2022 once their previous contracts expired on 31 May 2022.

Loans in

Out

Loans out

Released

Friendlies

Competitions

Overview

Premiership

League table

Results summary

Results

Scottish Cup

League Cup

Knockout stage

UEFA Europa Conference League

Second qualifying round

Squad statistics

Appearances

|-
|colspan="14"|Players away from the club on loan:

|-
|colspan="14"|Players who left Motherwell during the season:

|}

Goal scorers

Clean sheets

Disciplinary record

See also
 List of Motherwell F.C. seasons

References

Motherwell F.C. seasons
Motherwell
2022–23 UEFA Europa Conference League participants seasons